Hoplostethus tenebricus is a small deep-sea fish species belonging to the slimehead family (Trachichthyidae).

Location
It is found in the Western Indian Ocean (known only from Delagoa Bay, Mozambique).

Habitat
The habitat of Hoplostethus tenebricus can be found in a marine environment within a deep-water range.

Size

References

tenebricus
Fish described in 1980